Alan Hugh Schoen (born December 11, 1924) is an American physicist and computer scientist best known for his discovery of the gyroid, an infinitely connected triply periodic minimal surface.

Professional career
Alan Schoen received his B.S. degree in physics from Yale University in 1945 and his Ph.D. in physics from University of Illinois at Urbana-Champaign in 1958. His doctoral dissertation was entitled “Self-Diffusion in Alpha Solid Solutions of Silver-Cadmium and Silver-Indium.” After completing graduate work he was employed (between 1957 and 1967) as a research physicist by aerospace companies in California, and also worked as a free-lance solid-state physics consultant. In 1967, he took the position of senior scientist at NASA's Electronics Research Center (ERC) in Cambridge, Massachusetts, where he did geometry research and served as the Chief of the Office of Geometrical Applications. While at NASA, he also worked on expandable space frames. In 1970, Schoen accepted a position at California Institute of the Arts, where he taught calculus and computer graphics. In 1973, he accepted a teaching position in the Department of Design at Southern Illinois University Carbondale (SIUC), where he taught computer graphics, algebra, and analytic geometry to design students. This was a former home department of Buckminster Fuller - an American designer and inventor who popularized the geodesic dome. In 1982, Schoen accepted a joint appointment in the Department of Mathematics and Department of Computer Science at SIUC. In August 1985, he moved to the SIUC campus in Nakajo, Japan, where he taught a course in computer science and also helped to teach English at a local Japanese junior high school. Upon his return to Carbondale in 1988, he taught FORTRAN and Digital Design in the Electrical Engineering Department at SIUC until his retirement in 1995. After retiring from academia he continued his work on numerous infinite families of minimal surfaces and on inventing geometric puzzles and images.

Contributions
Alan Schoen is best known for discovering (while working at NASA) a minimal surface that he named the gyroid. The name stems from the impression in the gyroid's structure that each continuous channel in the array, along different principal crystallographic axes, has connections to additional intersecting channels, which “gyrate” along the channel length. The gyroid has become popular among scientists as more and more new occurrences of it in nature are being discovered.
Earlier in his career, while conducting his doctoral research on atomic diffusion in solids (1957), Schoen discovered that for self-diffusion in crystalline solids, there is a simple relation between the Bardeen-Hering correlation factor and the isotope effect that makes it possible to distinguish between vacancy and interstitial diffusion mechanisms. He later found evidence from a FORTRAN program that his equation is exact in all close-packed cubic structures. His finding was soon confirmed algebraically by Tharmalingam and Lidiard. Schoen's preoccupation with this subject eventually led him to an interest in minimal surfaces and the discovery of the gyroid.

Alan Schoen has also published scientific papers on families of minimal surfaces, and books on geometric images and puzzles. In the early 1990s, Schoen designed Rombix — a combinatorial dissection puzzle, which uses multicolored tiles that are composites of 8-zonogons, to create various designs. He also developed The Geometry Garret, a website full of different families of geometric structures (considered "cool stuff" by Alan's academic colleagues). Alan Schoen holds U.S. patents (see below) for six of his inventions.

Selected works
Schoen, Alan H. (1970) "Infinite periodic minimal surfaces without self-intersections." NASA Tech. Note No. D-5541. Washington, DC.

McSorley, John and Schoen, Alan. (2013) "Rhombic tilings of (n,k)-Ovals, (n,k,λ)-cyclic difference sets, and related topics." Discrete Mathematics 313, No. 1 (Jan 2013).

Ed Pegg, Alan H. Schoen, and Tom M. Rodgers. (2008) Homage to a pied puzzler. hardback — 325 pages, CRC Press/ Taylor and Francis Group. . 

Ed Pegg, Alan H. Schoen, and Tom Rodgers (2009) Mathematical wizardry for a Gardner hardback — 220 pages, A K Peters  

Schoen, Alan H. (2012) Reflections concerning triply-periodic minimal surfaces. Interface Focus 30 May 2012.

Patents
Listing of U.S. patents issued to Alan H. Schoen:

1972  Honeycomb core structures of minimal surface tubule sections
1972  Honeycomb panels formed of minimal surface periodic tubule layers
1973  Expandable space-frames
1994  Set of tiles for covering a surface
1994  Set of tiles for covering a surface
2001  Set of blocks for packing a cube

See also
 Gyroid
 List of physicists

References

External links
 The Geometry Garret
 Works by or about Alan Schoen in libraries (WorldCat catalog)
 Gyroid at MathWorld

American physicists
1924 births
Living people
Yale University alumni
University of Illinois Urbana-Champaign alumni
Southern Illinois University faculty